Vus'Umuzi Malinga (born 29 October 1979), best known as Vusi Malinga, is a South African professional boxer. He has challenged three times for a bantamweight world title, in 2009, 2012 and 2013.

Professional career

Malinga vs. Sahaprom
On 12 June 2008 Malingo fought former two-time bantamweight world champion Veeraphol Sahaprom in an eliminator for the right to fight for the WBC world title and won by technical knockout.

Malinga vs. Hasegawa
On 12 March 2009 Malinga fought Hozumi Hasegawa for the WBC world title where he lost by technical knockout.

Malinga vs. Domingo
On 30 October 2010 Malinga fought Michael Domingo in an eliminator for the right to fight for the IBF world title and won by unanimous decision.

Malinga vs. Santa Cruz
On 2 June 2012 Malinga fought Leo Santa Cruz for the vacant IBF world title where he lost by unanimous decision.  This bout was aired on Showtime.

Malinga vs. Hall
On 21 December 2013 Malinga fought Stuart Hall for the vacant IBF world title and lost by unanimous decision.

Professional boxing record

References

External links

1979 births
Living people
People from Katlehong
Bantamweight boxers
South African male boxers
Super-bantamweight boxers
Southpaw boxers
Sportspeople from Gauteng